Verona is a historic plantation house located near Jackson, Northampton County, North Carolina. It was built about 1855, and is a one-story, six bay, "T"-shaped, Italian Villa style frame dwelling.  It has a hipped roof, is sheathed in weatherboard, and sits on a brick basement.  It features a full-width porch, with flat sawnwork posts and delicate openwork brackets.  Also on the property is  the contributing family cemetery.  The house was built for Matt Whitaker Ransom (1826-1904), Confederate brigadier general, United States senator, and minister to Mexico, and his wife Martha Exum.

It was listed on the National Register of Historic Places in 1975.

References

External links

Historic American Buildings Survey in North Carolina
Plantation houses in North Carolina
Houses on the National Register of Historic Places in North Carolina
Italianate architecture in North Carolina
Houses completed in 1855
Houses in Northampton County, North Carolina
National Register of Historic Places in Northampton County, North Carolina